The Konferenz Nationaler Kultureinrichtungen (KNK) or Conference of National Cultural Institutions is a union of more than twenty cultural organizations in the former East Germany. It was established in 2002 in Halle.

It includes the following organizations:
 Stiftung Preußische Schlösser und Gärten
 Kulturstiftung Dessau-Wörlitz
 Fürst-Pückler-Park Bad Muskau
 Fürst-Pückler-Museum Park und Schloss Branitz 
 Wartburg Eisenach
 Staatliche Kunstsammlungen Dresden 
 Klassik Stiftung Weimar 
 Staatliches Museum Schwerin 
 Bauhaus Dessau 
 Kurt Weill Centre, Dessau
 Leipzig Museum of Applied Arts 
 Museum der bildenden Künste, Leipzig 
 Stiftung Moritzburg
 Kunstsammlungen Chemnitz
 Lindenau Museum Altenburg 
 Luthergedenkstätten in Sachsen-Anhalt
 Franckesche Stiftungen zu Halle 
 Senckenberg Naturhistorische Sammlungen Dresden
 Staatliche Ethnographische Sammlungen Sachsen
 Leipzig Museum of Ethnography
 Museum of Musical Instruments of the University of Leipzig 
 German Hygiene Museum, Dresden 
 Deutsches Meeresmuseum Stralsund
 Bach-Archiv Leipzig 
 Händel-Haus Halle

References

Cultural organisations based in Germany